Tulli is a surname. Notable people with the surname include:

 Alessandro Tulli (born 1982), Italian footballer
 Frank Tulli (born 1944), American former Republican member of the Pennsylvania House of Representatives
 Giacomo Tulli (born 1987), Italian footballer
 Magdalena Tulli (born 1955), Polish novelist
 Marco Tulli (1920–1982), Italian character actor
 Vincent Tulli (born 1966, French sound mixer and sound designer
 Abhi Tulli Notable player(born 2000)

See also 
 Tuļļi Lum, Estonian/Livonian folk music band
 Tulli Papyrus, document of questionable origins that some have interpreted as evidence of ancient flying saucers
 Tullis, a surname and given name
 Tulli (district), a district in central Tampere, Finland